Sang Yoon is a South Korean born-American restaurateur, chef and the owner of the Father's Office gastropub, chef and owner of Lukshon Restaurant, and the chef/partner in Two Birds One Stone. Chef Yoon was a contestant on Bravo Network's Top Chef Masters Season 5.

Life and career 
Yoon began his career in fine dining in Michelin-starred kitchens of Paris, New York, and Los Angeles including work at Chinois on Main and later as executive chef of Michael's, Santa Monica's famous dining destination for contemporary California cuisine. In 2000, Yoon struck out on his own by renovating his favorite local dive bar, Father's Office, where he trailblazed the gastropub movement in L.A. and beyond. Father's Office is critically and popularly acclaimed for its signature craft brew selection of over 55 local and small-batch varieties and the proprietary “Office Burger” has been hailed as the country's best burger by the TODAY Show and Esquire magazine.

Yoon has been profiled as a craft beer expert in USA Today, Food & Wine magazine, and National Public Radio and has been featured as a guest judge on Bravo's Top Chef and competing chef on Top Chef Masters. February 2011 saw Yoon's return to fine dining with the debut of Lukshon, a modern restaurant dedicated to traditional and creative Southeast Asian flavors that was recently named the #3 restaurant in Los Angeles from venerable food critic Jonathan Gold of the LA Times. In June 2016, Yoon opened Two Birds One Stone, a restaurant project in California's wine country. Yoon credits the loves of his life—champagne and hockey—with helping him to achieve an ideal work/life balance.

References

External links
Chef Sang Yoon official site
Father's Office official site
Lukshon official site
Bravo TV Official Site

After Hours episode with Sang Yoon

American chefs
Asian American chefs
American people of Korean descent
American restaurateurs
Living people
Year of birth missing (living people)